David de la Fuente Rasilla (born 4 May 1981 in Reinosa, Cantabria) is a Spanish professional road bicycle racer, who currently rides for UCI Continental team . De la Fuente led the mountains classification of the 2006 Tour de France for a number of stages, donning the Polka Dot jersey after stage 2, and then again after stage 11 until Michael Rasmussen took a commanding lead in the competition. For his numerous attacks, de la Fuente was subsequently awarded the combativity award.

Major results

2001
 1st Stage 5 Circuito Montañés
2004
 8th Clásica de Almería
2005
 3rd Trofeo Calvià
 6th Circuito de Getxo
2006
 Tour de France
1st Overall combativity award
Held  after Stages 2, 11–15
 Combativity award Stages 2 & 11
2007
 1st GP Llodio
 1st  Mountains classification Volta a la Comunitat Valenciana
 6th Trofeo Pollença
 9th Klasika Primavera
 10th Clásica de Almería
2008
 1st Stage 2 Deutschland Tour
 Tour de France
Held  after Stages 7–9
 7th GP Llodio
 8th Gran Premio Miguel Induráin
2009
 1st GP Miguel Induráin
 2nd GP Llodio
 8th Subida a Urkiola
 10th Overall Volta a Catalunya
2011
  Combativity award Stage 14 Vuelta a España
 8th Coppa Sabatini
2012
 6th Grand Prix de Plumelec-Morbihan
2013
 1st Stage 2 Tour of Qinghai Lake
2015
 1st Stage 3 Troféu Joaquim Agostinho
2016
 3rd Overall Volta ao Alentejo
 10th Overall GP Liberty Seguros
1st  Mountains classification
2017
 10th Overall Troféu Joaquim Agostinho
2018
 1st  Mountains classification Troféu Joaquim Agostinho
 3rd Overall Grande Prémio de Portugal N2
 10th Clássica Aldeias do Xisto
2019
 3rd Clássica da Arrábida

Grand Tour general classification results timeline

References

External links

1981 births
Living people
People from Reinosa
Spanish male cyclists
Cyclists from Cantabria
21st-century Spanish people